Patarcocha (possibly from Quechua qucha lake,) is a lake in the Cordillera Blanca in the Andes of  Peru located in the Ancash Region, Asunción Province, Chacas District. Patarcocha lies northwest of the lakes Yanacocha, Huegroncocha and Runtococha.

See also 
 Lauricocha

References 

Lakes of Peru
Lakes of Ancash Region